Peter Kleščík (born 18 September 1988) is a Slovak football player who last played for the Fortuna liga club 1. FK Příbram.

Previously he had spent 14 years with AS Trenčín, collecting over 300 caps and winning 2 doubles.

Career statistics

Honours

Club
AS Trenčín
 Fortuna Liga (2): 2014–15, 2015-16
Slovak Cup (2): 2014–15, 2015-16

References

External links
 AS Trenčín profile 
 

1988 births
Living people
People from Čadca
Sportspeople from the Žilina Region
Slovak footballers
Slovak expatriate footballers
Association football defenders
Slovak Super Liga players
Czech First League players
AS Trenčín players
1. FK Příbram players
Slovak expatriate sportspeople in the Czech Republic
Expatriate footballers in the Czech Republic
Expatriate footballers in Poland